is a Japanese anime, music production and anime licensee company owned by Sony Music Entertainment Japan. Established in September 1995, Aniplex has been involved in the  production and distribution of several anime series, such as both Fullmetal Alchemist anime television series, Bleach, Sword Art Online,  Puella Magi Madoka Magica, Demon Slayer: Kimetsu no Yaiba, Fate, the Monogatari series, Angel Beats!, The Promised Neverland, Rurouni Kenshin, and more. Additionally, Aniplex produces and distributes music and soundtrack records, including the original soundtracks for all of Sony Interactive Entertainment's computer and video games. Since the 2010s, Aniplex is also involved in the production and publishing of video games.

Aniplex is also involved in retail merchandising, producing toys, games, stationery, food and other items featuring popular characters. In addition, Aniplex puts together events to promote the anime franchises. For example, in 2005 Aniplex held the Fullmetal Alchemist Festival which began with the Fullmetal Alchemist Tour at Universal Studios Japan.

Aniplex is a full member of The Association of Japanese Animations and an associated member of Japan Video Software Association.

History
Originally known as Sony Pictures Entertainment (SPE) Visual Works Inc., it was established in September 1995 as a joint-venture between Sony Pictures Entertainment Japan and Sony Music Entertainment Japan, and changed its name in January 2001 to Sony Music Entertainment (SME) Visual Works Inc. after becoming a subsidiary completely owned by Sony Music Entertainment Japan. In April 2003, it changed its name to Aniplex Inc.

In 2004, Aniplex launched the Sugi Label, which releases the works of Koichi Sugiyama—the composer of the music for Dragon Quest, but since 2009 it was sold to King Records.

In March 2005, the company established its Santa Monica, California-based subsidiary Aniplex of America to reinforce its licensing business in the North American market, and later that same year in May 2005, it established its own animation studio called A-1 Pictures.

In March 2015, Aniplex announced that it had formed a joint venture with German anime distributor Peppermint Anime, forming Peppermint Anime GmbH. The joint venture allows for Aniplex to begin their expansion in the European market. In April 2015, Aniplex announced that it had invested in French anime streaming service Wakanim, becoming the majority shareholder for the company, allowing Aniplex to enter the French market, and strengthening their European presence.

On February 17, 2018, it was revealed that Aniplex had become a minority shareholder in the Australian-based company Madman Anime Group, and was issued an undisclosed number of shares in the company on November 15, 2017.

On October 1, 2018, Aniplex established Rialto Entertainment, a subsidiary responsible for independent video production, and licensing of produced video content. The subsidiary appointed Aniplex deputy president Tadashi Ishibashi as the subsidiary's representative director, and Aniplex producer Eiichi Kamagata as the subsidiary's president.

In April 2019, Aniplex announced that it established a Chinese subsidiary, Aniplex (Shanghai), in order to produce and release Chinese animation within the region, as well as establishing a storefront for Chinese consumers.

On September 24, 2019, Aniplex announced that it would be consolidating Madman Anime Group and Wakanim with Sony Pictures Television's Funimation, under a joint-venture between the two Sony businesses.

On December 26, 2019, Aniplex announced it would be launching a novel game brand named ANIPLEX.EXE, with ATRI: My Dear Moments and  being the first titles being released under the brand. ANIPLEX.EXE will also release titles in English territories through Aniplex of America.

On April 1, 2020, Aniplex established Boundary, a subsidiary focusing on 3D CG, with Aniplex producer Akira Shimizu becoming the company's president. 

Aniplex held Aniplex Online Fest, a virtual anime convention, on July 4–5, 2020. The event featured the latest updates on anime adaptations produced by Aniplex, panels with staff and cast members, and musical performances. Sally Amaki of 22/7 (Nanabun no Nijūni) served as the emcee for the English version, streaming worldwide on YouTube. A Chinese podcast was available on Bilibili.

After the successful inaugural event, which garnered more than 800,000 viewers from around the globe, Aniplex announced the return of Aniplex Online Fest on July 3, 2021. The second edition lineup included updates on Demon Slayer: Kimetsu no Yaiba, Sword Art Online the Movie -Progressive- Aria of a Starless Night, and Fate/Grand Order with musical performances by Aimer, ClariS, LiSA, ReoNa, and SawanoHiroyuki[nZk]. Sally Amaki returned to host the show alongside Maxwell Powers.

On February 1, 2021, Aniplex announced it had entered in a capital tie-up with game developer f4samurai, allowing for Aniplex to further expand into gaming.

On December 15, 2021, Aniplex announced the acquisition of Delight Works' game development division for an undisclosed sum. Delight Works will transfer all of its game operations, including the development team of Fate/Grand Order, to a newly established company through a corporate split. Aniplex will acquire this company and turn it into a wholly-owned subsidiary to continue and handle the development of Fate/Grand Order. The process is expected to be concluded by Spring 2022.

On February 1, 2022, Aniplex completed the acquisition of Lasengle from Delight Works. Yoshinori Ono, the President and chief operating officer of Delightworks, will serve as President and Representative Director of Lasengle. Yosuke Shiokawa, the creative producer behind Fate/Grand Order, left Delight Works and Lasengle at the end of January, establishing his studio Fahrenheit 213 to work on a new original franchise.

Published games

Anime productions 

Aniplex has been involved in the production and distribution with the following anime series.

009-1 (2006; Ishimori Productions)
22/7 (2020; A-1 Pictures)
86 (2021; A-1 Pictures)
A-Channel (2011–12; Studio Gokumi)
Ace Attorney (2016–19; A-1 Pictures (season 1) & CloverWorks (season 2))
Angel Heart (2005–06; TMS Entertainment)
After the Rain (2018; Wit Studio)
Akebi's Sailor Uniform (2022; CloverWorks)
Aldnoah.Zero (2014–15; A-1 Pictures & Troyca)
Altair: A Record of Battles 
Angel Beats! (2010–15; P.A.Works)
Anohana: The Flower We Saw That Day (2011–13; A-1 Pictures)
Arata-naru Sekai (2012; Madhouse)
Auto Boy - Carl from Mobile Land (2020; CloverWorks)
Baccano! (2007–08; Brain's Base)
Back Arrow (2021; Studio VOLN)
Banana Fish (2018; MAPPA)
Big Windup! (2007–10; A-1 Pictures)
Birdy the Mighty: Decode (2008; A-1 Pictures)
Birdy the Mighty Decode: 02 (2009; A-1 Pictures)
Black Butler (2008–17; A-1 Pictures)
Black Rock Shooter (2010–12; Ordet & Sanzigen (series only))
Blast of Tempest (2013; Bones)
Bleach (2004–12; Pierrot)
Blend S (2017; A-1 Pictures)
Blood
Blood: The Last Vampire (2000; Production I.G.)
Blood+ (2005–06; Production I.G.)
Blood-C (2011–12; Production I.G.)
Blue Exorcist (2011–12; A-1 Pictures)
Blue Exorcist: Kyoto Saga (2017; A-1 Pictures)
Bocchi the Rock! (2022; CloverWorks)
Buddy Daddies (2023; P.A. Works)
The Case Study of Vanitas (2021–22; Bones)
Cells at Work! (2018–21; David Production)
Cells at Work! Code Black (2021; Liden Films)
Charlotte (2015–16; P.A. Works)
City Hunter (1987-2019; Sunrise)
D.Gray-man (2006–08; TMS Entertainment)
D.Gray-man Hallow (2016; TMS Entertainment & 8Pan)
Darker than Black (2007–08; Bones)
Darker than Black: Gemini of the Meteor (2009–10; Bones)
DARLING in the FranXX (2018; CloverWorks, Trigger, & A-1 Pictures)
Darwin's Game (2020; Nexus)
The Day I Became a God (2020; P.A.Works)
Demon Slayer: Kimetsu no Yaiba (2019–21; Ufotable)
Devilman Crybaby (2018; Science Saru)
Dinosaur Biyori (2021; Fanworks)
Dog Days (2011–15; Seven Arcs)
Dogtato (2004; Studio Egg)
Do You Love Your Mom and Her Two-Hit Multi-Target Attacks? (2019–20; J.C.Staff)
Dokkiri Doctor (1998–99; Pierrot)
Durarara!! (2010–16; Brain's Base)
Erased (2016; A-1 Pictures)
Eromanga Sensei (2017; A-1 Pictures)
Eureka Seven (2005–21; Bones & Kinema Citrus (Good Night, Sleep Tight, Young Lovers)
Fair, then Partly Piggy (1988–98; Oh! Production (movie) & Group TAC (series))
Fate
Fate/Apocrypha (2017; A-1 Pictures)
Fate/Extra Last Encore (2018; Shaft)
Fate/Grand Order
Fate/Grand Order - Absolute Demonic Front: Babylonia (2019–20; CloverWorks)
Fate/Grand Order: Divine Realm of the Round Table: Camelot (2020–present; Signal.MD (Part 1) & Production I.G. (Part 2)
Fate/Grand Order: First Order (2016; Lay-duce)
Fate/Grand Order: Grand Temple of Time: Solomon (2021; CloverWorks)
Fate/Grand Order: Moonlight/Lostroom (2017; Lay-duce)
Fate/Grand Order: Seven Most Powerful Great Figures Chapter (2017; Ufotable)
Fate/stay night: Heaven's Feel (2017–20; Ufotable)
Fate/stay night: Unlimited Blade Works (2014–15; Ufotable)
Fate/Zero (2011; Ufotable)
 The Case Files of Lord El-Melloi II (2018-19; Troyca)
Flag (2006–07; The Answer Studio)
Fullmetal Alchemist (2003–06; Bones)
Fullmetal Alchemist: Brotherhood (2009–11; Bones)
Gakuen Alice (2004–05; Group TAC)
Galilei Donna (2013; A-1 Pictures)
Gallery Fake (2005; TMS Entertainment (episodes 1-25) & Tokyo Kids)
The Garden of Sinners (2007–13; Ufotable)
Ghost Slayers Ayashi (2006–07; Bones)
Ghost Stories (2000–01; Pierrot)
Gintama (2006–10; Sunrise)
Gintama''' (2011–13; Sunrise)Gintama° (2015–16; Bandai Namco Pictures)Gintama. (2017–18; Bandai Namco Pictures)Gintama The Final (2021; Bandai Namco Pictures)Ginban Kaleidoscope (2005; Karaku)Gravitation (1999-2001; Plum (OVA) & Studio Deen (series))Great Teacher Onizuka (1999-2000; Pierrot)Guardian Ninja Mamoru! (2006; Group TAC)Guilty Crown (2011–12; Production I.G.)Guin Saga (2009; Satelight)Gurren Lagann (2007–09; Gainax)The Gymnastics Samurai (2020; MAPPA)Hell Girl (2005–06; Studio Deen)Hell Girl: Two Mirrors (2006–07; Studio Deen)Hell Girl: Three Vessels (2008–09; Studio Deen)Hell Girl: The Fourth Twilight (2017; Studio Deen)Hidamari Sketch (2007–13; Shaft)Honey and Clover (2005–06; J.C.Staff)Horimiya (2021; CloverWorks)Hortensia Saga (2021; Liden Films)Hotarubi no Mori e (2011; Brain's Base)Hula Fulla Dance (2021; BN Pictures)Hypnosis Mic: Division Rap Battle: Rhyme Anima (2020; A-1 Pictures)I Want to Eat Your Pancreas (2018; Studio VOLN)I'll CKBC (2002–03; M.S.C.)Idaten Jump (2005–06; Trans Arts)The Idolmaster (2011–14; A-1 Pictures)The Idolmaster: Cinderella Girls (2015-16; A-1 Pictures)The Idolmaster SideM (2017-18; A-1 Pictures)Inu x Boku SS (2012; David Production)Inuyasha: The Final Act (2009–10; Sunrise)Inuyashiki (2017; MAPPA)The Irregular at Magic High School (2014–present; Madhouse (season 1) & Eight Bit (future works))The Honor Student at Magic High School (2021; Connect)Jing: King of Bandits (2002–04; Studio Deen)Kabaneri of the Iron Fortress (2016–17; Wit Studio)Kaguya-sama: Love is War (2019–22; A-1 Pictures)Kamichu! (2005; Brain's Base)Kannagi: Crazy Shrine Maidens (2008–09; A-1 Pictures & Ordet)Katanagatari (2010; White Fox)Kiba (2005–06; Madhouse)Kikaider-01 - The Animation - Guitar wo Motta Shōnen (2000–02; Radix & Studio OX)Kill la Kill (2013–14; Trigger)Kimi to Boku (2011–12; J.C.Staff)Kyorochan (1999-2001; Group TAC)La Corda D'Oro - Primo Passo (2006–07; Yumeta Company)La Corda D'Oro - Secondo Passo (2009; Yumeta Company)Le Portrait de Petit Cossette (2004; Daume)Level E (2011; Pierrot & David Production)Love Lab (2013; Doga Kobo)Love Me, Love Me Not (2021; A-1 Pictures)Lovely Complex (2007; Toei Animation)Lycoris Recoil (2022; A-1 Pictures)Magi: The Labyrinth of Magic (2012–14; A-1 Pictures)Magi: Adventure of Sinbad (2014–16; Lay-duce)Magic Kaito 1412 (2014–15; A-1 Pictures)Magical Girl Lyrical Nanoha the Movie 1st (2010; Seven Arcs)Magical Girl Lyrical Nanoha the Movie 2nd A's (2012; Seven Arcs)March Comes in Like a Lion (2016–18; Shaft)Meow Meow Japanese History (2016–20; Joker Films)Mirage of Blaze: Rebels of the River Edge (2002–04; Madhouse)Misaki no Mayoiga (2021; David Production)The Misfit of Demon King Academy (2020; Silver Link)Mitsudomoe (2010–11; Bridge)Monogatari (2009–19; Shaft)Bakemonogatari (2009–10; Shaft)Nisemonogatari (2012; Shaft)Nekomonogatari (2012; Shaft)Monogatari Series: Second Season (2013–14; Shaft)Tsukimonogatari (2014; Shaft)Owarimonogatari (2015 & 17; Shaft)Kizumonogatari (2016–17; Shaft)Koyomimonogatari (2016; Shaft)Zokuowarimonogatari (2019; Shaft)Mushi-Shi -Next Passage- (2014–15; Artland)My Dress-Up Darling (2022–; CloverWorks)Naruto (2002–17; Pierrot)Boruto: Naruto Next Generations (2017–present; Pierrot)Natsume's Book of Friends (2008–18; Studio Deen (seasons 1-4) & Shuka (seasons 5 & 6 & movie)Nerima Daikon Brothers (2006; Studio Hibari)Night Raid 1931 (2010; A-1 Pictures)Nisekoi (2014–15; Shaft)No. 6 (2011; Bones)Occult Academy(2010; A-1 Pictures)Occultic;Nine (2016; A-1 Pictures)Oreimo (2010–13; AIC Build (season 1) & A-1 Pictures (season 2))Oreshura (2013; A-1 Pictures)Oresuki (2019; Connect)Paradise Kiss (2005; Madhouse)PaRappa the Rapper (2001–02; J.C.Staff & Production I.G.)Plastic Memories (2015; Doga Kobo)PersonaPersona: Trinity Soul (2008; A-1 Pictures)Persona 3 The Movies (2013–16; AIC ASTA (movie 1) & A-1 Pictures (movies 2, 3, & 4))Persona 4: The Animation (2011–12; AIC ASTA)Persona 4: The Golden Animation (2014; A-1 Pictures)Persona 5: The Animation (2016–19; A-1 Pictures)Ping Pong the Animation (2014; Tatsunoko Production)Popolocrois Monogatari (1998–99; Bee Train & Production I.G.)Powerpuff Girls Z (2006–07; Toei Animation)Pretty Boy Detective Club (2021; Shaft)The Promised Neverland (2019–21; CloverWorks)Puella Magi Madoka Magica (2011–13; Shaft)Magia Record (2020–present; Shaft)Punch Line (2015; MAPPA)Ranking of Kings (2021; Wit Studio)Rascal Does Not Dream of Bunny Girl Senpai (2018–19; CloverWorks)Read or Die (2001–02; Studio Deen)R.O.D the TV (2003–04; J.C.Staff)Record of Grancrest War (2018; A-1 Pictures)Rewrite (2016–17; Eight Bit)Robotics;Notes (2012–13; Production I.G.)Roujin Z (1991; A.P.P.P.)Rurouni Kenshin (1996–2012; Gallop (series episodes 1–66) & Studio Deen (future works)))Saekano: How to Raise a Boring Girlfriend (2015; A-1 Pictures)Saekano: How to Raise a Boring Girlfriend ♭ (2017; A-1 Pictures)Saekano the Movie: Finale (2019; CloverWorks)Sekirei (2008–10; Seven Arcs)The Seven Deadly Sins (2014–15; A-1 Pictures)The Seven Deadly Sins: Signs of Holy War (2016; A-1 Pictures)The Seven Deadly Sins: Revival of The Commandments (2018; A-1 Pictures)Shadows House (2021; CloverWorks)Shiki (2010; Daume)Silver Spoon (2013–14; A-1 Pictures)SK8 the Infinity (2021; Bones)Soul Eater (2008–09; Bones)Sound of the Sky (2010; A-1 Pictures)Space Brothers (2012–14; A-1 Pictures)Spiral: The Bonds of Reasoning (2002–03; J.C.Staff)Star Driver (2010–11; Bones)Submarine 707R (2003; Group TAC)Super HxEros (2020; Project No.9)Sword Art Online (2012-2020; A-1 Pictures)Tekkonkinkreet (2006; Studio 4°C)Terror in Resonance (2014; MAPPA)Togainu no Chi (2010; A-1 Pictures)Toward the Terra (2007; Tokyo Kids & Minamimachi Bugyōsho)Tsuritama (2012; A-1 Pictures)Uchitama?! Have you seen my Tama? (2020; MAPPA & Lapin Track)Ultimate Otaku Teacher (2015; A-1 Pictures)Urusei Yatsura (2022-Present; David Production)Valkyria Chronicles (2009–11; A-1 Pictures)Valvrave the Liberator (2013; Sunrise)Vampire Knight (2008; Studio Deen)Vampire Knight Guilty (2008; Studio Deen)Vivy: Fluorite Eye's Song (2021; Wit Studio)Wandering Son (2011; AIC Classic)Warlords of Sigrdrifa (2020; A-1 Pictures)We Never Learn (2019; Silver & Arvo Animation)Welcome to the Space Show (2010; A-1 Pictures)Wonder Bevil-kun (2003–04; Radix)Wonder Egg Priority (2021; CloverWorks)Working!! (2010–16; A-1 Pictures)Wotakoi: Love is Hard for Otaku (2018; A-1 Pictures)Xam'd: Lost Memories (2008–09; Bones)Yakitate!! Japan (2004–06; Sunrise)Yashahime: Princess Half-Demon (2020–21; Sunrise)Your Lie in April (2014–15; A-1 Pictures)Yuuna and the Haunted Hot Springs'' (2018; Xebec)

References

External links 
Aniplex official website 
Aniplex Corporate Profile - English - Official Website

 
Anime companies
Sony Music Entertainment Japan
Sony subsidiaries
Entertainment companies of Japan
Japanese record labels
Music companies of Japan
Film distributors of Japan
Mass media companies based in Tokyo
Mass media companies established in 1995
Japanese companies established in 1995